Cabella  is a surname. Notable people with the surname include:

 Rémy Cabella, a French professional footballer 
 Salvatore Cabella, an Italian water polo player

See also

Cabella (disambiguation)
Cabello (surname)

References

surnames